Countdown is an album by pianist Steve Kuhn which was recorded in 1998 and released on the Reservoir label.

Reception

The AllMusic review by  Michael G. Nastos stated "A neglected figure in the overall scheme of modern jazz, perhaps this magnificent recording from the veteran pianist Kuhn will somewhat salve that wound. He is masterfully impressionistic, skillful as any, extra-lyrical, and his talent is in full array ... This music clearly inspires all kinds of lush, regal imagery. It is Kuhn at his best, one of the more soul-stirring piano trio CDs of recent hearing, and a joy to listen to more than just once". In JazzTimes, Duck Baker noted "Kuhn’s solos are fluid and interesting; he certainly favors long lines and usually manages to make them build effectively. I can’t say that Kuhn has ever seemed to me to be a strongly original voice in terms of harmony, touch, or voicings, and occasionally he gets dangerously over-impressionistic. But some of the best originals here contain surprising moments and the soloing holds up well". On All About Jazz, C. Andrew Hovan said "it's chock full of complexity and substance, yet also very inviting and accessible ... Countdown is a step forward for Kuhn and a valuable addition to this independent's small but substantial catalog".

Track listing
All compositions by Steve Kuhn except where noted
 "Countdown" (John Coltrane) – 3:48
 "Chalet" – 5:07
 "Last Year's Waltz" – 3:26
 "Wrong Together" (Steve Swallow) – 6:26
 "Four" (Miles Davis) – 7:06
 "Why Did I Choose You?" (Michael Leonard, Herbert Martin) – 4:52
 "When Lights Are Low" (Benny Carter, Spencer Williams) – 6:46
 "She's Funny That Way" (Neil Moret, Richard A. Whiting) – 4:30
 "Speak Low" (Kurt Weill, Ogden Nash) – 9:32
 "Tomorrow's Son" – 3:20

Personnel 
 Steve Kuhn – piano 
 David Finck – bass 
 Billy Drummond – drums

References 

Steve Kuhn albums
1999 albums
Reservoir Records albums
Albums recorded at Van Gelder Studio